The Coalition for Rainforest Nations (CfRN) is an intergovernmental organization established by forested tropical countries to collaboratively reconcile forest stewardship with economic development. The Rainforest Coalition aims to bring together both developing and industrialized nations for the purpose of creating community-driven, environmentally sustainable growth.

The primary strategy of the Coalition is to bring about the reform of international frameworks, both legal and economic, to correct market failures that result in unsustainable outcomes, and to create economic incentives for the preservation of areas of high biodiversity and endemism worldwide. The Coalition supports the Forests Now Declaration calling for changes in the Kyoto Protocol and other international carbon markets to include land use and forestry.

The Coalition has been instrumental in the establishment of the World Bank's Forest Carbon Partnership Facility and the United Nations' UN-REDD program.  Further, based upon these efforts by the Coalition, various industrialized countries (including Norway, the UK, Germany, France, Japan, Australia, Finland, and others) have currently pledged around US$3.0 billion for capacity building and incentives to reduce rates of deforestation in participating developing countries.

History
At the request of then Prime Minister of Papua New Guinea Sir Michael Somare, the participating nations have agreed to base the Secretariat for the Coalition for Rainforest Nations at Columbia University in the City of New York.  The CfRN was formed after a speech given on May 10, 2005, at Columbia University by Somare.

Objectives
The Coalition's website defines its objectives as developing policies and tools which assist in achieving sustainability for both forests and neighboring agricultural lands. Additionally, the CfRN:

 seeks to manage tropical rainforests in a way which supports climate stability, conserves biodiversity, and helps development and poverty alleviation efforts
 assists in crafting new financial tools in cooperation with governments, communities, businesses, and other interested parties
 helps to find ways to allow sustainable livelihoods while also improving living standards in communities which depend on rainforests
 sets a path which enables similar results in other countries with tropical rainforests.

Initiatives
The CfRN operates multiple initiatives in pursuit of its objectives.

Fund 
The REDD+ Catalytic Fund provides "bankable up-front funding" for nations attempting to finance ways to reduce their greenhouse gas outputs. The REDD+ program, started in 2005 by the UNFCC, offers financial rewards for nations which achieve proven results in gas reductions; however, it offers no assistance to reach that goal. The CfRN sees the REDD+ Catalytic Fund as complementary to funds which pay for results.

National Green House Gas Inventories 
The National Green House Gas (GHG) Inventories attempt to reflect a nation's total emission of gases which contribute to global warming and climate change. It also shows how much  is being absorbed by rainforests, which offset to some degree a nation's total output. These inventories are required from members of the UNFCCC and the Paris Agreement. As a part of the UNFCC and Paris Agreement, National GHG Inventories show how much progress a nation has made in reducing its GHG output and how much further it has to go to achieve its goals.

The CfRN has provided technical assistance to member nations in preparing their National GHG Inventories. Members which have successfully submitted their inventories include Belize, Panama, Papua New Guinea, and the DR of the Congo, as well as others.

Controversies 
in May 2017, Kevin Conrad, Director of the Coalition for Rainforest Nations, unsuccessfully applied to register 'REDD+' as a private trademark in the US. in a response to a request for comment, Conrad stated that his intention was to stop the misuse of the brand by the Voluntary Carbon Market.

In March 2021, Conrad signed an MOU with PNG Climate Change Minister Wera Mori, giving Conrad the sole rights to trade PNG's carbon. The MOU states that it is intended to lock out all private arrangements. A letter from a coalition of PNG based civil societies criticises this MOU, stating that it has been implemented with no consultation with existing rights owners, that it does not comply with PNG's  Free, Prior and Informed Consent rules, and questions how, in the absence of any Government decision or legislative framework, the minister can unilaterally give 10% of PNG's carbon to Conrad.

Member nations
As of 2019, the Coalition for Rainforest Nations comprises the following 53 nations:

Africa 

 Botswana
 Cameroon
 Central African Republic
 Democratic Republic of the Congo
 Equatorial Guinea
 Gabon
 Ghana
 Kenya
 Lesotho
 Liberia
 Madagascar
 Malawi
 Mali
 Mozambique
 Namibia
 Nigeria
 Republic of the Congo
 Sierra Leone
 South Africa
 Sudan
 Uganda
 Zambia

The Americas and the Caribbean 

 Argentina
 Belize
 Costa Rica
 Dominica
 Dominican Republic
 Ecuador
 Guatemala
 Guyana
 Honduras
 Jamaica
 Nicaragua
 Panama
 Paraguay
 Saint Lucia
 Suriname
 Uruguay

Asia 

 Bangladesh
 Cambodia
 India
 Indonesia
 Laos
 Malaysia
 Pakistan
 Singapore
 Thailand
 Vietnam

Oceania 

 Fiji
 Papua New Guinea
 Samoa
 Solomon Islands
 Vanuatu

See also

 Sustainable development
 Rainforest
 Biodiversity

References

External links
 Coalition for Rainforest Nations official website
 Forest Carbon Partnership Facility
 UN-REDD Programme
 REDD Plus Mechanism

International forestry organizations
Rainforests
Tropical rainforests
International environmental organizations
International sustainability organizations
Sustainable forest management
United Nations coalitions and unofficial groups
Environmental organizations established in 2005
2005 establishments in New York (state)
Columbia University research institutes